Kakeda Toshimune (died 1548) was a Japanese samurai of the Sengoku period, who served the Date clan.

Date retainers
Samurai
1548 deaths
Year of birth unknown